The women's sprint event at the 2018 World Singles Ninepin Bowling Classic Championships was held in Cluj-Napoca, Romania on 23 May 2018.

The defender of the title was the Pole Beata Włodarczyk, who did not take off in Cluj after the end of her career and therefore did not have the opportunity to defend the championship. The new champion of the world became Croatian Ines Maričić, after defeated her compatriot Mirna Bosak in final. The bronze medals was won by Hungarian Anita Méhész and Swedish Jenny Smevold.

Results

Starting places 

The starting places have been allocated on the basis of each team's achievements during the previous championships.

Draw 

The players were drawn into pairs with the reservation that competitors from the same country can not play in the first round against each other.

References 

2018
Women's sprint